Richard Engelbrecht-Wiggans is an American economist, focusing in operations research, quantitative analysis of decisions and mathematical programming for management science and operations research, decision sciences, currently the IBE Distinguished Professor Emeritus at University of Illinois.  

He graduated from Harvard College and Cornell University.

References

Bibliography

Year of birth missing (living people)
Living people
University of Illinois faculty
American economists
Harvard College alumni
Cornell University alumni